Bichaur  is a village development committee in Lamjung District in the Gandaki Zone of northern-central Nepal. At the time of the 1991 Nepal census it had a population of 2462 people living in 488 individual households.

2015 Nepal earthquake

The village was affected by the earthquake on 25 April 2015. It along with Ilampokhari, Dudhpokhari, Gaudu, Kolki and Pyarjung were the most affected villages in Lamjung district.

References

External links
UN map of the municipalities of Lamjung District

Populated places in Lamjung District